Henry Barrington "Tim" Tristram (5 September 1861 – 1 October 1946) was an English sportsman who played international rugby union for England and first-class cricket.

Tristram was the only son (among many daughters) of the clergyman and ornithologist Henry Baker Tristram. He was educated at Loretto School, Winchester College and Hertford College, Oxford.

Tristam played his rugby as a fullback and took part in the inaugural Home Nations Championship in 1883, debuting in England's final fixture against Scotland. England won the championship that year and he was also a member of three further campaigns, including their second title win in 1884.

From 1883 to 1893, he played with the Durham County Cricket Club, but his matches didn't have first-class status. His only first-class match came when he was studying at Oxford in 1883, representing the university against the Gentlemen of England. A right-handed batsman, he came in at four in each innings, but scored just six and one.

In 1903 he replaced his brother in-law, Hely Hutchinson Almond, as Headmaster of Loretto School. He remained in that position until 1908, when he was forced to retire south because of delicate health. He taught for four more years at St Paul's School in London, but then retired even further south to Jersey.

References

1861 births
1946 deaths
Alumni of Hertford College, Oxford
Cricketers from County Durham
Durham cricketers
England international rugby union players
English cricketers
English rugby union players
Oxford University cricketers
People educated at Loretto School, Musselburgh
People educated at Winchester College
People from Greatham, County Durham
Rugby union players from County Durham
Scottish educators
Rugby union fullbacks